Basil Oliver Allen (13 October 1911 – 1 May 1981) was an English first-class cricketer.

Allen was educated at Clifton College  and Caius College, Cambridge. A left-handed batsman and fine close fieldsman, he played for Cambridge University Cricket Club in 1932 and 1933. He then enjoyed a long county career as an amateur for Gloucestershire from 1932 to 1951, captaining the county in 1937 and 1938 and from 1947 to 1950.  He also played first-class matches for Marylebone Cricket Club from 1936 to 1939 and the Gentlemen in 1938.

Allen scored 14 first-class hundreds, with his only double century, 220, coming against Hampshire in 1947. His best season was 1938, when he scored 1785 runs at an average of 34.32.

References

External links
 

1911 births
1981 deaths
English cricketers
Gloucestershire cricketers
Gloucestershire cricket captains
People educated at Clifton College
Alumni of Gonville and Caius College, Cambridge
Cricketers from Bristol
Marylebone Cricket Club cricketers
Gentlemen cricketers
North v South cricketers
Cambridge University cricketers